is a Japanese four-panel comic strip written and illustrated by . The strip has been serialized in Houbunsha's seinen manga magazine Manga Time Kirara Max since April 19, 2007. It is about Kana Nakamachi and her growing experience as a newspaper deliverer, cook, and orphan.

The anime adaptation premiered in Japan on July 5, 2009, by Feel.

Plot
The story centers on Kana Nakamachi, a middle-school girl who had already lost her parents and just recently lost her only remaining relative, her grandmother. As a result, she ends up living and working at a newspaper delivery office. Everyone else living at the office are all charming, self-assertive bishōjo.

The manga follows Kana's daily life in the fast-paced yet joyous environment.

Characters

Kana is the main protagonist of the story, a young girl of thirteen years old. After the death of her parents, she is an orphan living with her grandmother. At the beginning of the story her grandmother also passes away. When repo-men come to repossess the grandmother's belongings, Kana assumes she is being repossessed too and runs away. Her search for a new lodging leads her to the Fuhshin Gazette, where she now lives.
Kana is a particularly soft spoken and shy girl who also gets frightened a lot, particularly in the presence of Haruka. She also tends to generally overreact to things she doesn't quite understand and frequently misinterprets them. Having lost her grandma, she sometimes gets rather lonely whenever she realizes she will inevitably have to leave the Fuhshin Gazette. However, she is willing to prove herself and do what she needs to help the paper. Although she is sometimes clumsy and not generally skilled at various things, she is rather good at cooking.

Saki is the assistant chief of Fuhshin Gazette, despite still being in elementary school. She is the only "serious" one of the group, and frequently reprimands the other girls when they neglect their duties. However, she often helps Kana with her problems, including stepping in when Haruka becomes too invasive, and is also prone to giving spontaneous rewards to everyone else, even though she always justifies her actions in the format of "We were (fill in the blank), anyway." Although having a mental disposition of a mature adult, she will sometimes act like a polite child in order to befriend classmates and convince their parents to buy subscriptions.

Yume is an energetic girl with a taste for sweet things. For the most part, she is carefree and consistently in a good mood, sometimes to the point of annoyance in people around her. She is a student at a patisserie academy, and, whenever cooking, often adds far too much sugar than what the recipe calls for (such as when she added two bags of sugar to a dish of curry). She and Yuuki are a couple, albeit an odd one. She is obsessed with doing everything with Yuuki, and is severely disappointed when they are denied the opportunity.

Yuuki is a tall shy girl and Yume's girlfriend and soulmate. Her emotional state is usually placid, except when Yume is doing something with someone else without her. She and Yume share an expressive yuri love, even kissing in public occasionally. When it comes to Yume's affections, Yuuki is very territorial, emitting a dangerous aura whenever Yume is doing something fun without her.

Hinata is a carefree girl who likes to gamble or invest through various means, such as Horseracing and the stock market, but is otherwise hesitant about spending money on things such as cotton candy at a festival, claiming it to be "just a bunch of sugar". She has attempted to join a college numerous times, but has failed entrance exams twice, with a third failure being predicted frequently by the others. She is nice to Kana, occasionally helping her. Like Saki, she too will stop Haruka when she becomes invasive of Kana's space. Interesting of note is her unique usage of the masculine pronoun "I" ("boku") when referring to herself, where a female Japanese speaker would usually refer to herself using "watashi" or the more feminine "atashi".

Haruka is a mature blue-haired girl who wears glasses. She is an avid drinker of sake, and as such is often drunk. She attends college, studying bio-fermentation, and creates numerous different beverages from biologic substances (the resulting concoction almost always being alcoholic). She is a self-proclaimed lolicon with a fetish for young girls under 15, often making various advances on Kana, who fears her greatly in this regard.

Mika delivers newspapers at another center, although she won't admit it unless directly confronted. She is quick to blame others, and frequently turns her mistakes into inconveniences. When she becomes lost during a route, she literally runs into Kana, then forgives her by "allowing" her to escort her to her next stop, later becoming friends. She seems to have a crush on Kana, and gets riled up at the thought of Kana having a boyfriend. In the manga, Mika has feelings for Kana and Kana in turn has strange feelings for Mika like the enjoyment of seeing Mika wallow in nervous waiting.

Other characters

Marimo is a minor character who appears in the eighth and twelfth episodes. She is a former Fuhshin Gazette employee before she graduated from college, and has a reputation as the worst employee the newspaper company ever had. Nevertheless, she was well liked by everyone. She and Saki shared a special friendship, although Saki rarely likes to bring it up. Following her work at Fuhshin Gazette, she lives off of odd jobs, such as selling vegetables in the flea market for outrageously cheap prices. When she is not working, she will, according to her words, "go where the wind takes her, where her mood takes her".

Kana and Mika's friend and classmate.

Kana and Mika's other friend and classmate.

Another classmate and friend of Kana and Mika.

Bunta is a stray cat that hangs around the Fuhshin Gazette. She is treated as a member of the family, and is often a form of encouragement for Kana.

Kaniko is a robotic representation of the manga artist, Shoko Iwami, who appears in omake chapters of the manga and as a transition effect that spouts nonsensical things in the anime.

A friend and classmate of Saki.

Media

Manga
The original manga by Shoko Iwami was serialized in Houbunsha's Manga Time Kirara Max magazine from April 19, 2007, to October 19, 2013. Six tankōbon volumes have been released:

Anime
An anime television adaptation by Feel was announced in the March 2009 issue of Houbunsha's Manga Time Kirara Max magazine. The series aired in Japan between July 5, 2009, and September 27, 2009, and was simulcast by Crunchyroll. The series is licensed in North America by Maiden Japan.

Episode list

References

External links
Official Anime Website 
TV Tokyo's Official Anime Website 

2007 manga
2009 Japanese television series endings
Anime series based on manga
Comedy anime and manga
Feel (animation studio)
Houbunsha manga
Japanese LGBT-related animated television series
Maiden Japan
Seinen manga
Slice of life anime and manga
TV Tokyo original programming
Yonkoma
Yuri (genre) anime and manga